Ben Wiegers was the Coach of Dutch national women's curling team from 2002 to 2006.
When he started coaching the team, they were ranked 17th in Europe. When he quit the team was ranked 7th in Europe and had qualified for the Women World Curling Championships.

References

Dutch male curlers
National team coaches
Living people
Year of birth missing (living people)
Place of birth missing (living people)
Curling coaches
21st-century Dutch people